Global Commercial Credit LLC is an American trade credit and political risk insurance broker.

History
Global Commercial Credit was founded on March 1, 1996 by Craig Bonnell and Victor Sandy in Bingham Farms, Michigan with the goal of offering a wider range of trade credit insurance products than was available from their previous employer. They targeted middle-market companies with revenues of between $50 million and $500 million, an area which David Brophy, a finance professor at the University of Michigan, said was underrepresented due to a trend towards larger banks.

The company opened a second office, in Chicago, Illinois, in the fall of 1996 and reported that they had protected over $2 billion in receivables, representing five different insurers, after 10 months of business. With offices now in Boston, Baltimore, Tampa, Chicago, and Cleveland, the company protects over $40 billion in global sales with more than a dozen carriers.

References

External links

Benefits of Working with a Credit Insurance Specialty Broker
What are the Benefits of Credit Insurance?
How to Buy Credit Risk Insurance
"Global Commercial Credit, of Bingham Farms, Leads in Domestic, Export Consulting", by Jerome O'Neill, Michigan Banker, November 1997

Companies based in Michigan
Insurance companies of the United States
Financial services companies established in 1996
Companies established in 1996
Financial services companies of the United States
1996 establishments in Michigan